Aurelio Bacciarini (8 November 1873 – 27 June 1935) was a Swiss Roman Catholic who served as the interim administrator of the Diocese of Lugano. He was a professed member of the Servants of Charity - also known as the Guanellians - and was also the founder of the Secular Institute of the Company of Saint Therese of the Child Jesus. He became known in his diocese as the "Apostle of the Sacred Heart".

He was proclaimed to be Venerable in 2008 after Pope Benedict XVI recognized that he had lived a life of heroic virtue. A miracle attributed to his intercession required for his beatification is now under investigation.

Early life
Aurelio Bacciarini was born in Ticino in Switzerland on 8 November 1873 to Lodovico and Maria Sciarini as the seventh of eight children; one older sister was Filomena. He was baptized on 9 November under the Provost Father Pietro Vaghetti with the names of "Stefano Aurelio". The eighth child - a sister - died in 1875 soon after birth and his father died on 6 September 1876.

Career 
He went to Vaghetti for support in following his vocation and he soon commenced his theological studies in Milan. He was ordained to the priesthood on 12 June 1897 in Rome in the church of Santa Maria degli Angeli. He served as a spiritual director from 1903 to 1906. On 8 October 1906 in Como he entered Luigi Guanella's order and ascended to the post of its Superior General in 1915. The beginning of 1917 saw Pope Benedict XV appoint him as the Apostolic Administrator of Lugano and he received his episcopal consecration a week later in Rome under Cardinal Basilio Pompili. He was also consecrated as the Titular Bishop of Daulia. Bacciarini was committed to the reorganization of Catholic Action as well as the promotion of crucifixes in public spaces.

His program for his diocese was thus:
Renew religious life in families
Educate children in the faith

Bacciarini established several diocesan institutions that included a newspaper - "Giornale del Popolo" - in 1926 and his own religious congregation at the same time. He was described as the "Apostle of the Sacred Heart".

Bacciarini died on 27 June 1935 at 4:45pm in Lugano. He was buried in the Shrine of the Sacred Heart.

Beatification process
The beatification process commenced in Lugano in 1946 under Pope Pius XII in a process that spanned until 25 March 1964. This occurred despite the fact that the formal introduction of the cause was not until 15 December 1981 under Pope John Paul II; it was this introduction that conferred upon him the posthumous title Servant of God. The local process was ratified in 1982 and culminated with the creation of the Positio. It was sent to the Congregation for the Causes of Saints in Rome in 1997 for further evaluation.

On 15 March 2008 he was declared to be Venerable after Pope Benedict XVI recognized that Bacciarini had lived a life of heroic virtue.

The miracle needed for his beatification was investigated and the process received the formal decree of ratification in 2007.

References

External links
Hagiography Circle
Catholic Hierarchy

1873 births
1935 deaths
19th-century venerated Christians
20th-century venerated Christians
Swiss Roman Catholics
Founders of Catholic religious communities
Venerated Catholics by Pope Benedict XVI
People from Locarno District